Montgomery Motor Speedway is a half-mile (.805 km) oval race track just west of Montgomery, Alabama.  It opened in 1953, and is the oldest operating race track in Alabama. It held six NASCAR Grand National Series races between 1955 and 1969. Huffman Motor Sports purchased the facility on February 5, 1999, and the track was extensively renovated and lighted in 1999.

In November 2004, Bill Manful bought Montgomery Motor Speedway.
In 2006, then owner Bill Manful leased the track to Hyundai, a local car manufacturer, to allow the facility to become a storage site.

In 2008, Bobby and Mark Knox of Clanton, Alabama laid claim to the speedway when they purchased it in an auction from Manful. After a lengthy legal battle to resume operations of the facility, they obtained a business license in February 2009 and opened as The New Montgomery Motor Speedway, LLC. The track is in operation running a bi-weekly schedule.

NASCAR Grand National results

References

External links
Official website
Montgomery Speedway (former name) race results at Racing-Reference
Montgomery Motor Speedway archive at Racing-Reference

Buildings and structures in Montgomery County, Alabama
NASCAR tracks
Motorsport venues in Alabama
Sports in Montgomery, Alabama
Tourist attractions in Montgomery County, Alabama
Sports venues completed in 1953
1953 establishments in Alabama